Aynur Erge is a Turkish freestyle wrestler competing in the 50 kg division. She is a member of Enkaspor.

Career 
In 2018, she won the silver medal in the women's 50 kg event at the 2018 European Juniors Wrestling Championships held in Rome, Italy.

In 2021, she won the bronze medal in the women's 50 kg event at the 2021 European U23 Wrestling Championship held in Skopje, North Macedonia.

References

External links 
 

Living people
Turkish female sport wrestlers
1998 births
20th-century Turkish sportswomen
21st-century Turkish sportswomen